Dhudi is a village in Faridkot district of Punjab state of India. The total population of the village is about 4,165.

References

Villages in Faridkot district